is a Japanese softball pitcher for the Japan women's national softball team. She represented Japan at the 2020 Summer Olympics and won a gold medal.   
 
She participated at the 2018 Asian Games, and the 2018 Women's Softball World Championship.

References

External links 
 WBSC Women's Softball World Championship - Day 10
 Japan’s Yamato Fujita in the final against China

1990 births
Living people
Asian Games medalists in softball
Asian Games gold medalists for Japan
Japanese softball players
Medalists at the 2014 Asian Games
Medalists at the 2018 Asian Games
Medalists at the 2020 Summer Olympics
Olympic gold medalists for Japan
Olympic medalists in softball
Olympic softball players of Japan
Softball players at the 2014 Asian Games
Softball players at the 2018 Asian Games
Softball players at the 2020 Summer Olympics
Competitors at the 2022 World Games
World Games silver medalists
World Games medalists in softball
21st-century Japanese women